Jeff Owens (born October 14, 1986) is a former American football defensive tackle. He was drafted by the Philadelphia Eagles in the seventh round of the 2010 NFL Draft. He played college football at Georgia.

Early years
Owens played high school football at Plantation High School in Plantation, Florida.

Professional career

Philadelphia Eagles
Owens was selected by the Philadelphia Eagles in the seventh round (243rd overall) of the 2010 NFL Draft. He was signed to a four-year contract on June 4, 2010. He was waived on September 4, but re-signed to the team's practice squad on September 5. He was promoted to the active roster on December 21. He was placed on injured reserve on December 29 after suffering a left patellar tendon rupture in a week 16 game against the Minnesota Vikings. He was waived on July 28, 2011, after failing his physical.

High School Coaching
As of the 2011 football season, Owens is coaching the defensive line at West Forsyth High School in Cumming, Georgia. The 2011 Wolverines advanced to the third round of the GHSA playoffs, their best year to date.

Personal life
He is a member of  Zeta Nu chapter of Phi Beta Sigma fraternity.

References

External links

Official blog
Philadelphia Eagles bio
Georgia Bulldogs bio

1986 births
Living people
People from Plantation, Florida
Owens, Jeff
Players of American football from Florida
Sportspeople from Broward County, Florida
American football defensive tackles
Georgia Bulldogs football players
Philadelphia Eagles players
High school football coaches in Georgia (U.S. state)